George Beech (15 March 1892 – 4 January 1964) was an English professional footballer who played as a forward and left back in the Football League for Brighton & Hove Albion. He served as a coach during his second spell with the club.

Personal life 
Beech served as an acting sergeant with the Middlesex Regiment's 1st Football Battalion during the First World War. After his retirement from football, Beech ran pubs in Brighton and qualified as a masseur. He trained the Brighton Tigers between 1949 and 1952.

Career statistics

References

1892 births
1964 deaths
Footballers from Sheffield
English footballers
Association football forwards
Association football fullbacks
Sheffield Wednesday F.C. players
Brighton & Hove Albion F.C. players
Bridgend Town A.F.C. players
Ebbw Vale F.C. players
Southern Football League players
English Football League players
British Army personnel of World War I
Middlesex Regiment soldiers
Brighton & Hove Albion F.C. non-playing staff
Clapton Orient F.C. wartime guest players
Masseurs
Military personnel from Sheffield